Derrymullan, also Derrymullen, is a 226-acre townland on the north side of Ballinasloe in County Galway, Ireland. It is in the barony of Clonmacnowen and the civil parish of Kilcloony.

References

Ballinasloe
Townlands of County Galway